Puma Energy Pakistan, formerly known as Admore Gas, is a Pakistani oil marketing company which is a subsidiary of Singaporean company Puma Energy and is based in Karachi, Pakistan.

It was founded in 2001. The company operates more than 470 retail shops in the country.

In 2014, it was acquired by the Pakistani conglomerate company Chisti Group.

In 2017, Puma Energy acquired majority stake in the company. As a result, company became a joint-venture between Puma Energy and Chisti Group.

Acquisition 
Cnergyico Pk Ltd is in the process of acquiring 57.37 per cent shares of Puma Energy Pakistan. Once the transaction is completed then Cnergyico Pk Ltd would become country's second-largest fuel retailer.

See also
 Attock Petroleum Limited
 Pakistan State Oil
 Shell Pakistan

References

Pakistani subsidiaries of foreign companies
Oil and gas companies of Pakistan
Mergers and acquisitions of Pakistani companies
2014 mergers and acquisitions
Joint ventures
Pakistani companies established in 2001
Energy companies established in 2001
Automotive fuel retailers